Georg Ludwig Carius (August 24, 1829 – April 24, 1875) was a German chemist born in Barbis, in the Kingdom of Hanover. He studied under Friedrich Wöhler and was assistant to Robert Bunsen for 6 years. He was Director of the Marburger Chemical Institute (Marburger Chemischen Instituts) of Philipps University of Marburg from 1865. He is noted for the studies of oxidation for which he developed a method involving high temperature digestion in a sealed tube. Heavy wall sealed tubes, as used for digestion or thermolysis, are referred to as "Carius tubes". He also wrote a textbook on polybasic acids.

References

External links
Genealogy Database Entry
Andrea Sella's Classic Kit

1829 births
1875 deaths
People from Bad Lauterberg
People from the Kingdom of Hanover
19th-century German chemists
Academic staff of the University of Marburg